Elizabeth Woolsey (December 28, 1908 – January 11, 1977) was an American alpine skier. She competed in the women's combined event at the 1936 Winter Olympics. She was the US national alpine skiing women's champion in 1934.

References

External links
 

1908 births
1977 deaths
American female alpine skiers
Olympic alpine skiers of the United States
Alpine skiers at the 1936 Winter Olympics
Sportspeople from Albuquerque, New Mexico
20th-century American women